Amblyseius paucisetosus is a species of mite in the family Phytoseiidae.

References

paucisetosus
Articles created by Qbugbot
Animals described in 1985